Neurhermes is a genus of dobsonflies in the family Corydalidae.

Description 
Questions about whether Neurhermes and Protohermes are separate genera have been raised repeatedly, with several species being transferred between the two. Neurhermes can be differentiated from Protohermes by presence of protrusions from the sternite plate. Geologic uplift likely resulted in speciation across mainland southeast Asia, followed by dispersal to Sundaland.

Species in Neurhermes and some in Protohermes were originally placed in the genus Hermes because of their dark coloration and yellow spots. The dark colors have been described as an example of homoplasious Batesian mimicry to the Zygaenidae moths. Neurhermes males produce large nuptial gifts of gelationous spermatophores, but maintain smaller weaponry and sexual dimorphism. Unlike most other dobsonflies, Neurhermes are active during the day, possibly meaning the dark wing color is more related to preventing hybridization with other sympatric genera.

Nanocladius asiaticus have a commensal relationship with many Asian Corydalidae species, and Neurhermes maculipennis serves as the host in the Malay peninsula.

Taxonomy 
Neurhermes contains the following species:

 Neurhermes costatostriata
 Neurhermes maculifera
 Neurhermes maculipennis
 Neurhermes nigerescens
 Neurhermes selysi
 Neurhermes sumatrensis
 Neurhermes tonkinensis

References 

Corydalidae